Radomyšl is a market town in Strakonice District in the South Bohemian Region of the Czech Republic. It has about 1,300 inhabitants.

Administrative parts
Villages of Domanice, Láz, Leskovice, Podolí and Rojice are administrative parts of Radomyšl.

Geography
It lies in the Blatná Uplands. There are several ponds in the municipal territory.

History
The first written mention of Radomyšl is from 1284, when it was a property of Bavors of Strakonice. In 1320, it was already referred to as a market town in a deed, in which Vilém Bavor of Strakonice donates the church and the rectory to the Knights Hospitaller. In 1359, in his will, Vilém Bavor transferred ownership of the entire village to this order, which owned Radomyšl until the abolition of serfdom in 1848.

Demographics

Sights

There are two churches in the market town. The Church of Saint Martin in the centre of Radomyšl was originally a Romanesque church. Shortly before 1388, it was rebuilt in the Gothic style, then it was baroque rebuilt in the early 18th century. The second church is the Church of Saint John the Baptist on a hill east of Radomyšl. It is a pilgrimage church from 1733–1736 that replaced an old Renaissance building. Both churches are connected by the Stations of the Cross.

The town hall is a Neoclassical building from 1836.

Notable people
Norbert Čapek (1870–1942), founder of the modern Unitarian Church in Czechoslovakia

Twin towns – sister cities

Radomyšl is twinned with:
 Montoggio, Italy

References

External links

Populated places in Strakonice District
Market towns in the Czech Republic
Prácheňsko